Cerro Tristeza is a mountain in South America. Cerro Tristeza lies within the coastal state of Sucre, Venezuela, near the border with the Venezuelan state of Anzoátegui.

See also
 List of Ultras of South America

References

External links
 

Tristeza
Geography of Sucre (state)